Brian Kelly or Brian Kelley may refer to:

Arts and entertainment
Brian Kelly (actor) (1931–2005), television actor best known for his role in the US TV series Flipper
Brian Kelly (blogger), American travel blogger and founder of The Points Guy
Brian Kelly (director), British television director
Brian Kelly (editor) (born 1954), American journalist and author
Brian Kelly (historian), historian and Reader in U.S. History at Queen's University Belfast
Brian Kelley (musician) (born 1985), member of the American country music duo Florida Georgia Line
Brian Kelley (writer), American television writer

Sports

Association football
Brian Kelly (footballer, born 1937) (1937–2013), English professional footballer active in the 1950s
Brian Kelly (footballer, born 1943) (1943–2018), English professional footballer active in the 1960s
Brian Kelly (American soccer) (born 1974), U.S. soccer midfielder

Gridiron football
Brian Kelley (American football) (born 1951), American football linebacker
Brian Kelly (wide receiver) (born 1956), Canadian football Hall of Famer
Brian Kelly (American football coach) (born 1961), American college football coach at LSU
Brian Kelly (cornerback) (born 1976), American football cornerback

Other sports
Brian Kelly (Australian footballer) (1917–1985), Australian rules footballer and coach
Brian Kelly (boxer) (1938–2016), American boxer
Brian Kelly (lacrosse) (born 1980), American lacrosse player
Brian Kelly (Gaelic footballer) (born 1990), Irish sportsperson
Brian Kelly (rugby league) (born 1996), Australian rugby league footballer

Others
Brian Kelly (chess player) (born 1978), chess international master
Brian Kelley (CIA officer) (1943–2011), American CIA agent
Brian T. Kelly (born 1960s), United States Air Force general

See also
Bryan Kelly (born 1934), British composer
Bryan Kelly (baseball) (born 1959), retired Major League Baseball pitcher